Atabapo River is a river of Venezuela and Colombia. It forms the international boundary between the two countries for much of its length. It is part of the Orinoco River basin.

See also
List of rivers of Venezuela

References
Rand McNally, The New International Atlas, 1993.

Rivers of Venezuela
Colombia–Venezuela border
Border rivers
Rivers of Colombia
International rivers of South America